John Hancock  (24 February 1808 – 11 October 1890) was a British naturalist, ornithologist, taxidermist and landscape architect. Working during the golden age of taxidermy when mounted animals became a popular part of Victorian era interior design, Hancock is considered the father of modern taxidermy

Hancock introduced the style of dramatic and lifelike arrangement in taxidermy. One of his famous works "Struggle with the quarry" depicted a falcon attacking a heron which held an eel. This taxidermy mount was an attraction at the 1851 Great Exhibition at the Crystal Palace in London.

Life and work 
Hancock was born in Newcastle upon Tyne to John Hancock Sr. who ran a saddle and hardware business. Their grandfather, Thomas had been a saddler and ironmonger with a shop on Tyne Bridge prior to 1771 when it was destroyed in a flood. For some time the family lived at Bensham and after the death of their father at the age of 43 in 1812, their mother moved them to Windmill Hills, Gateshead. Along with his brother Albany Hancock they took an early interest in natural history from their father who had a large collection of books on natural history.The children went to a seminary run by a Miss Anna Prowitt and here he learned to draw. The brothers also learned some mathematics from Henry Atkinson, on the High Bridge. They formed a small band of naturalists who travelled to nearby places in summer. This was well before the formation of the Natural History Society of Northumberland and Durham in 1829 and later groups like the Tyneside Naturalists' Field Club in 1846 in which he participated. Already in 1829 he was the first to note the differences between the whooper and Bewick's swan although a formal notice on the subject was read first by R.R. Wingate, a neighbour of Thomas Bewick. John Hancock learned taxidermy from Richard Wingate. Hancock travelled with fellow naturalist William C. Hewitson and Benjamin Johnson to Norway in 1833. With Hewitson, they then visited Switzerland in 1845. Hancock was also an artist and produced several lithographic prints in the 1850s depicting his taxidermy preparations. His taxidermy mounts presented in the 1851 Great Exhibition drew great praise for their artistry. 

Hancock was a mentor and tutor to the celebrated ornithologist and bird painter, Allan Brooks. For some time after 1878, following the death of W. C. Hewitson, Hancock lived at Hewitson's home in Oatlands, Surrey, which he had bequeathed to Hancock. The brothers lived with their sister, Mary Jane, at 4 St. Mary's Terrace, Newcastle, now part of a listed terrace at 14–20 Great North Road.

Drawing and publishing

Hancock learned engraving and lithography and made several illustrated works. His 1863 "A Fasciculus of Eight Drawings on Stone of Groups of Birds, the whole being representations of specimens stuffed and contributed by the Author to the Great Industrial Exhibition of 1851" included drawings of his taxidermic mounts. In 1874, Hancock published his Catalogue of the Birds of Northumberland and Durham. These works drew acclaim from Professor Alfred Newton for the accuracy of observation.

Hancock edited Thomas Bewick's 1847 edition of Birds. In 1868 he planned a layout for Newcastle Town Moor, which was only partly realised. In 1875, he was asked to prepare a plan for Saltwell Park, but declined due to pressure of work.

Museum

The Hancock Museum in Newcastle upon Tyne is named after the Hancock brothers, both of whom took an instrumental part in getting the museum built to house older collections made by Marmaduke Tunstall, George Allan and others. The collections were held by the Natural History Society of Northumberland, Durham, and Newcastle-on-Tyne and the members of the society included P. J. Selby, Nathaniel J. Winch, W. C. Hewitson, Dr. George Johnston of Berwick, Joshua Alder, and Albany Hancock. Alder and Hancock collected marine specimens extensively. It was after Albany died in 1873 that a memorial was considered and John Hancock suggested a newer and larger building for the collections. Hancock persuaded Colonel John Joicey to purchase a site opposite Barras bridge and it was presented to the Society. Built finally and opened in 1884, John Hancock was responsible for much of the reorganization of the new museum. Hancock also prepared flat skins for the collection and received specimens from as far as India through correspondents like Edward Blyth. The museum contains many specimens from their collections. Hancock's collection includes a specimen of the red-necked nightjar Caprimulgus ruficollis claimed to be the first one from Britain and continues to stand as a unique record. Suspicions of an error in the records or even of wilful fraud have been dismissed as Hancock was careful in recording collection information. In some specimens such as an alpine swift without location information, he even noted the fact that it was missing accurate location information. Hancock was also the first to record the breeding of the black redstart in 1845. The museum came to be called the Hancock Museum in 1890 after the death of John Hancock.

References

External links

 Hancock correspondence
 Index-catalogue of the birds in the Hancock collection (1899)
 biography

1808 births
1890 deaths
English ornithologists
English naturalists
Scientists from Newcastle upon Tyne
People educated at the Royal Grammar School, Newcastle upon Tyne
English landscape architects
19th-century British zoologists